Mad FM (91.5 FM) is a radio station broadcasting from Trinidad and Tobago.

Radio stations in Trinidad and Tobago
Radio stations established in 2011